The Word for Snow is a one-act play by Don DeLillo. Inspired by global climate change, the play concerns a pilgrim who seeks out a professor who has fallen silent.

The play was commissioned by the Chicago Humanities Festival and premiered on October 27, 2007, in a production by the Steppenwolf Theatre Company. Subsequent to a West End production in 2012, Manhattan's Karma bookstore published the manuscript in 2014.

References

2007 plays
Plays by Don DeLillo
One-act plays